Gulnara Samoilova (born 1964) is a Russia-born American photographer, living in New York City. Her work in New York City after the September 11 attacks won a World Press Photo award and is held in the collection of the Museum of Fine Arts, Houston. Samoilova is the founder of the website, social media platform and travelling exhibition Women Street Photographers, and edited a book of the same name.

Life and work
Samoilova was born and grew up in Ufa, Bashkortostan, Russia. After school she worked in a photo lab, then became a portrait photographer, and later a photojournalist for a local newspaper. She gained a diploma in photography from Moscow Polytech College.

In 1992 Samoilova moved to New York City and studied at the International Center of Photography. She worked for the Associated Press and photographed the aftermath of the September 11 attacks in New York City in 2001.

In 2017 Samoilova launched the website, social media platform and travelling exhibition Women Street Photographers, to show street photography by women. In 2021 a book of the same name was published, which she edited, containing the work of 100 photographers.

Publications
Women Street Photographers. Munich; London; New York: Prestel, 2021. Edited by Samoilova. . With a foreword by Ami Vitale and an essay by Melissa Breyer.

Awards
2002: First Prize: People in the News, Singles category, World Press Photo, Amsterdam for a photograph in New York City after the September 11 attacks

Collections
Samoilova's work is held in the following public collection:
Museum of Fine Arts, Houston: 4 prints from New York City after the September 11 attacks (as of August 2021)

References

External links

21st-century American photographers
American women photographers
Photographers from New York City
American photographers
People from Ufa
Living people
1964 births
21st-century American women